The 1980 Paris synagogue bombing (also called the Rue Copernic attack) occurred on 3 October 1980 when the rue Copernic synagogue in Paris, France was bombed. The attack killed four and wounded 46 people. The bombing took place in the evening near the beginning of Shabbat, during the Jewish holiday of Sim'hat Torah. It was the first deadly attack against Jewish people in France since the end of the Second World War. 

The Federation of National and European Action (FANE) claimed responsibility, though it was later determined that a Zionist infiltrator of the FANE falsely claimed responsibility for the attack. The police investigation later concluded that Palestinian nationalists were likely responsible.

Proceedings
The bombing, on 3 October 1980 at 18:38, directed against a synagogue of the Union Libérale Israélite de France, Copernic street in Paris, that was filled for Sabbath services.  Saddlebags packed with 10 kilograms of explosives were left on a motorcycle parked in front of the synagogue. The glass roof of the synagogue fell down on the worshipers, and one of the doors was blown through. Some cars on the street were projected into the road, the fronts windows of shops were blown through up to 150 metres.

Philippe Bouissou (22 years old) who passed by on his motorbike was killed immediately. Aliza Shagrir (42 years old), an Israeli TV presentator on holiday, was also killed while she was walking on the pavement, as was Jean Michel Barbé who used to frequently visit the synagogue. Hilario Lopes-Fernandez, the Portuguese housekeeper of the Victor Hugo hotel, located almost in front of the temple, was seriously wounded and died two days later.

The commemorative plaque fixed onto the synagogue notes: "In memory of Jean Michel Barbé, Philippe Bouissou, Hilario Lopez Fernandez, Aliza Shagrir killed during the odious attack committed against this synagogue on 3 October 1980."

The explosive, consisting of about 10 kg of pentrite, in the bags of a blue Suzuki TS 125 motorbike parked about 10 metres from the synagogue, could have caused more victims if it had happened a few minutes later, when the worshippers left: as it was the day before shabbat, the synagogue was full with 300 people coming to celebrate the Bar Mitzvah of three boys and Bat Mitzvah of two girls.

Reactions 

The day after, a march of several thousands of people started in front of the synagogue, and went to the Champs Elysées, while other protests took place in other cities in provinces On 7 October 1980 a demonstration of 200,000 people marched from Nation to République. Several Members of Parliament joined the movement.

Statement by Raymond Barre 

The Prime Minister, Raymond Barre, on 3 October said on TF1: "This odious bombing wanted to strike Jews who were going to the synagogue and it hit innocent French people who crossed the Copernic street", a Freudian slip that his words of the 8 October in the National Assembly, assuring his "Jewish compatriots" of the "sympathy of the all nation", failed to assuage. Just before his death in August 2007, Raymond Barre attributed this campaign of protestations to "Jewish lobby".

Effect on 1981 French Presidential election 
The anger provoked by the bombing and Barre's statement has been credited as being at least partly responsible for the election of Socialist François Mitterrand as president of France in the 1981 Presidential election over incumbent Valéry Giscard d'Estaing.

Suspects
A number potential suspects were investigated, including Spanish neo-Nazis, Libyans,Palestinian nationalists and the French extreme right.

False Neo-Nazi lead 
Within hours of the bombing, a man claiming to represent the neo-Nazi Federation of National and European Action (FANE) called the Agence France-Presse to claim responsibility on behalf of the FANE. However, the caller was later identified as a 25-year-old Jewish man and Zionist named Jean-Yves Pellay who stated he claimed responsibility to "get the neo-Nazis in trouble with the law".

Hassan Diab 
Police sought two Cypriot suspects, Alexander Panadryu and Joseph Mathias, but the investigation did not progress at the time. It was alleged that five Palestinians had travelled to France under forged Cypriot passports. Thirty-four years later, Hassan Diab, a Canadian of Lebanese origin, was extradited to France in November 2014. Since then three French anti-terrorism judges have uncovered testimony from several individuals stating that Diab was in Lebanon at the time of the bombing as well as University records which show he wrote and passed exams in Beirut then and couldn't have been in Paris. They ordered his conditional release under electronic surveillance eight times, only to have their orders challenged by the prosecutor and overturned by an appeal court. He was released without charge on January 12, 2018 and returned to Canada on January 15, 2018. However, on May 19, 2021, a French court upheld the earlier decision, directing him to stand trial.

References

1980 in Judaism
Improvised explosive device bombings in 1980
1980 in Paris
1980 crimes in France
20th-century attacks on synagogues and Jewish communal organizations
Antisemitism in France
Improvised explosive device bombings in France
Mass murder in 1980
October 1980 events in Europe
Terrorist incidents in Paris
Palestinian terrorist incidents in Europe
Terrorist incidents in France in 1980
Building bombings in France
Terrorist incidents by unknown perpetrators
Unsolved mass murders